Abraham & Straus, commonly shortened to A&S, was a major New York City department store, based in Brooklyn. Founded in 1865, it became part of Federated Department Stores in 1929. Shortly after Federated's 1994 acquisition of R.H. Macy & Company, it eliminated the A&S brand. Most A&S stores took the Macy's name, although a few became part of Stern's, another Federated division, but one that offered lower-end goods than Macy's or A&S did.

History

Timeline
1800s - The store was founded in 1865 in Brooklyn, New York, as Wechsler & Abraham by Joseph Wechsler and Abraham Abraham. In 1893, the Straus family (including Isidor Straus and Nathan Straus), who acquired a general partnership with Macy's department stores in 1888, bought out Joseph Wechsler's interest in Wechsler & Abraham and changed the store's name to Abraham & Straus. While Abraham & Straus did not at that time become a part of Macy's, the two stores shared an overseas office and maintained close ties.
1900s - Federated Department Stores, Inc. was formed in 1900 as a holding company by several family-owned department stores, including Abraham & Straus, F&R Lazarus & Co. (along with its Cincinnati-based subsidiary, Shillito's), and Filene's of Boston. Corporate offices established in Columbus, Ohio, later moved to Cincinnati. In 1992, Federated Department Stores merged with Allied Stores Corporation. The A&S and Jordan Marsh divisions were consolidated, forming the A&S/Jordan Marsh division, headquartered in Brooklyn, NY. Early in the new year, Macy's filed for bankruptcy protection under Chapter 11. In 1994 the Federated Department Stores acquired the now bankrupt R.H. Macy & Company and combined Macy's, headquartered in New York City, with A&S/Jordan Marsh. In 1995, the name Abraham & Straus was dropped in favor of the more widely known name Macy's. In the few cases where both companies had stores in the same mall, only one building was kept as a Macy's.
2000s - In 2006, a historic bronze plaque honoring Isidor and Ida Straus and memorializing their deaths during the sinking of the RMS Titanic was removed from the Macy's flagship store during a 34th Street store renovation, and given to the Straus family. On May 29th 2014, members of the Straus family, the Straus Historical Society, and Macy's Executive Staff gathered for the re-dedication of the Isidor and Ida Straus Memorial Plaque at the 34th Street Memorial Entrance of Macy's Herald Square.

Founding and early history
The first Brooklyn store, at 285 Fulton Street, opened in 1865 and measured 25 feet by 90 feet. Abraham Abraham, age 22, and Joseph Wechsler each contributed $5,000 for the purchase. In 1883, the firm bought the recently built Second Empire cast-iron Wheeler Building at 422 Fulton Street to be their flagship store.

On April 1, 1893, Nathan Straus, Isidor Straus, and Simon F. Rothschild as partners – the Straus brothers provided the financing, but Rothschild was the active partner – bought out Wechsler, and the firm became Abraham & Straus. At the time, the company had 2,000 employees. Simon F. Rothschild, Abraham's son-in-law, Edward Charles Blum, and son, Lawrence Abraham, became partners in the new firm.

1900–1969
By 1900, the company had 4,650 employees. From the 1890s to the 1920s, A&S utilized a system of catalog store agencies across Long Island to serve customers.

In 1912, Isidor Straus, along with his wife Ida, perished in the sinking of the RMS Titanic.

Around 1915, after Abraham's daughter married Isidor's son Percy Selden Straus, the Straus family divided up the empire with Nathan's family running A&S and Isidor's family running Macy's.

Beginning in 1928, the company embarked on a $7.8 million expansion of the Fulton Street Store, which included excavating a new basement without disturbing customers above. The renovated store opened October 10, just days before the Wall Street Crash of 1929. In 1929, the company also joined Filene's, Lazarus, and Bloomingdale's to form Federated Department Stores. To economize during the Depression, the company began scheduling employees according to hourly sales. In addition, all employees took a 10 percent pay cut. No employees were laid off.

In 1937, Walter N. Rothschild led the company, and served as president and chairman until 1955. Following Rothschild, Sidney L. Solomon became the company's first non-family president. At the time, the company had 12,000 employees.

After World War II – The company grew. In 1950, the company purchased Loeser's Garden City store, and two years later, its first new branch store opened in Hempstead, New York.

In the following decades, the company expanded throughout the New York metropolitan area. Among its expansions was an anchor store at Paramus Park in Paramus, New Jersey, which necessitated the building of an access road that, despite the conversion of the store to Macy's, is still today known as A&S Drive.

1970–1995
In the 1970s, Federated attempted to update the image of A&S and funded the construction of new, more upscale stores. A&S developed a new logo that once again branded the stores Abraham & Straus. The company opened a central distribution center which decreased the amount of non-selling space needed in each store.

In 1978, the firm opened the first of its more upscale stores at the Monmouth Mall in Eatontown, New Jersey. This was followed by stores in White Plains, New York in 1980, The Mall at Short Hills in New Jersey, in 1981, and a replacement for the chain's Babylon, Long Island store at Westfield Sunrise Mall.

In 1981 and 1982, the chain opened two stores at malls in the suburban Philadelphia market, The Court at King of Prussia and Willow Grove Park Mall. These new stores struggled to find their niche, and the two Pennsylvania stores were closed in 1987 and 1988, respectively, and the space became occupied by Philadelphia-based Strawbridge and Clothier.

The Short Hills, New Jersey store seemed out of place in the very upscale mall, and customers resisted what were seen to be the store's more rigid policies concerning check acceptance, inter-store transfers, and refunds. Eventually, A&S would stock the Short Hills location with merchandise that better befit the location.

In 1994, Federated acquired Macy's. Since both Macy's and A&S competed for the same type of middle-income customer, Federated  felt that the lesser-known A&S brand should be eliminated. In January 1995, it was announced that all A&S locations would be converted to other brands by April 30. Most became Macy's or Stern's, but at least one location was converted to a Bloomingdale's and another was sold to Sears.

Fulton Street flagship store

The company's 841,000-square-foot Brooklyn flagship store was located at 422 Fulton Street, in the Fulton Street Mall.

From the beginning, the company had high aspirations. In 1885, the company hired architect George L. Morse to work on the Fulton Street store in Downtown Brooklyn. For their 1928 to 1930 renovations and additions, the company hired architects Starrett & van Vleck to build an Art Deco addition that faced Fulton, Hoyt, and Livingston Streets. In 2003, the Brooklyn Heights Association and the Municipal Art Society put the building on a list of 28 historic buildings in downtown Brooklyn that needed to be protected.

In the mid-1970s, Abraham & Straus' flagship store made mannequin modeling famous. Linda Timmins, head of the division, selected one juvenile and ingénue with "The Editorial Look" from each of the high schools across Brooklyn and Manhattan. The schools and their students were also selected for high academic standing; Manhattan Performing Arts High School student Yvette Post, Metropolitan Opera juvenile star Robert Westin, Brooklyn's Abraham Lincoln High School's Alan Jay Kahm and head cheerleader Paula Gallo, as well as Maria Russo of Catherine McAuley High School (Brooklyn) were some of the few selected to represent the youth of New York. These "Mannequin Models" would pose for up to an hour at a time in the windows of the store as "Living Mannequins", wearing classic designer clothes and current fashions designed by Nik Nik, Pierre Cardin, and other top designers and exclusive prêt-à-porter from upscale fashion houses.

Eventually, as crowds would often stop traffic and became a safety hazard, Abraham & Straus had to move the Living Mannequins inside the store or face a stiff penalty from the city. Despite this change, the crowds still came. Each season, the young mannequin models would be allowed to move in order to do an in-store runway show for the Designer de Jour. Although it was the 1970s, the store did not feature polyester suits or non-designer outfits in these shows.

Unlike countless numbers of downtown department stores that have closed throughout the nation, this historic location continues as a Macy's. At , it is the second-largest Macy's in the New York City area. Macy's utilizes the lower level through 5th floor for retail departments, the 6th floor for seasonal merchandise and a beauty salon, and upper floors for a number of corporate departments. Display windows continue to be maintained along Fulton Street, and the elevator bank in the middle of the street floor continues to evoke hints of this building's elegant past. The passenger elevators at this location were among the last in all of New York City to be converted from manual operator to automatic use. Macy's has continued to reaffirm its commitment to this location.

On July 16, 2014, Women's Wear Daily' reported that Macy’s had stopped the renovation of its Brooklyn flagship while it considered possibly selling the property, which could be worth $300 million from a developer looking to turn it into condominium apartments. It had also been reported that Macy's was considering building a new Downtown Brooklyn store.

By 2016, the decision was made to remain in the current location, but consolidate the space into four level floors and sell off the remaining floors. As of 2018, the work continues to progress.

See also
 List of defunct department stores of the United States

References

Retail companies established in 1865
Retail companies disestablished in 1995
Defunct department stores based in New York City
Clothing retailers of the United States
Private equity portfolio companies
Companies based in New York City
Macy's, Inc.
Companies that filed for Chapter 11 bankruptcy in 1990
1865 establishments in New York (state)
1995 disestablishments in New York (state)